Mejbil Fartous (born 6 July 1950) is an Iraqi football coach and former footballer. He played as a defender.

International goals
Iraq national football team goals
Scores and results list Iraq's goal tally first.

Honours

Club
Al-Quwa Al-Jawiya
Iraqi Premier League: 1974–75
Iraq Central FA League: 1972–73, 1973–74
Iraq FA Baghdad Cup: 1973–74

International
Palestine Cup of Nations runner-up: 1975
Arabian Gulf Cup runner-up: 1976

Individual 
4th Arabian Gulf Cup Best Defender Award

References

External links
Iraq - Record International Players at rsssf.com

Iraqi footballers
1950 births
Living people
Al-Quwa Al-Jawiya players
Iraq international footballers
Sportspeople from Baghdad
Association football defenders
1972 AFC Asian Cup players
1976 AFC Asian Cup players
Iraqi football managers
Expatriate football managers in the United Arab Emirates
Expatriate football managers in Qatar
Al-Quwa Al-Jawiya managers
Al-Wakrah SC managers